The Taiwan scimitar babbler (Pomatorhinus musicus) is a bird in the family Timaliidae, the Old World babblers. It is endemic to Taiwan. The species was first described by Robert Swinhoe in 1859. It was formerly treated as a subspecies of the streak-breasted scimitar babbler. Its population is declining, but not rapidly enough for it to be considered vulnerable.

References

Further reading
Collar, N. J. and C. Robson. Family Timaliidae (Babblers). Pp. 70 – 291. In: del Hoyo, J., et al., eds. Handbook of the Birds of the World, Vol. 12. Picathartes to Tits and Chickadees. Lynx Edicions, Barcelona. 2007.

Taiwan scimitar babbler
Birds of Taiwan
Endemic birds of Taiwan
Taiwan scimitar babbler